Thanh Thanh Hiền (born in 1969) is Vietnamese vocalist of cải lương.


Biography

See also
 Cải lương
 Xuân Hinh

References

People from Hanoi
21st-century Vietnamese women singers
1969 births
Living people
20th-century Vietnamese women singers